Fenech-Soler were an English electropop band from King's Cliffe, Northamptonshire, England, that formed in 2006 and consists of two members: Ross Duffy and Ben Duffy. Founding members Daniel Fenech-Soler and Andrew Lindsay left the band in 2016. The name Fenech-Soler is taken from Daniel Soler's full surname, which is Maltese. The band's sound has been compared to Friendly Fires and Delphic for their "hybrid of summery indie and big dance-inflected melodies". Fenech-Soler are signed to So Recordings.

Career
Fenech-Soler's self-titled debut studio album was released in 2010 and included three singles. The single "Stop and Stare" was named by BBC Radio 1 DJ Greg James as 'Record of the Week' and 'Weekend Anthem' and Dutch public broadcaster NOS used "Demons" as an anthem for their 2010–11 UEFA Champions League broadcasts. Both "Lies" and "Demons" were playlisted by Radio 1. The band recorded a Radio 1 Live Lounge session for Jo Whiley in February 2011.

On 13 March 2011, it was announced that Ben Duffy had been diagnosed with testicular cancer and would have to undergo a course of chemotherapy. This caused the cancellation of the nine-date UK tour. The cancer was diagnosed in its early stages and two months later it was announced that the treatment was '100% successful' and Duffy was 'now in complete remission'. The band returned to a busy summer schedule of 23 festivals including Glastonbury and V Festival. Fenech-Soler donated all proceeds from their 18 April 2011 single "Stop and Stare" to the Teenage Cancer Trust. That same year, the band was a supporting act for the White Lies, Kelis, Robyn and Example.

The band released their second album, Rituals, on 30 September 2013. The release of the album was announced following the announcement of a UK tour, which coincided with the release of the single "Magnetic" in March.  The album's second single, "Last Forever", was released early in September prior to the album.

In 2014, Fenech-Soler performed at a medal awards ceremony at the 2014 Winter Olympics in Sochi. In addition to their own work, they are also known for their remix work, including a remix of "Self Control" by Sunday Girl, "Kickstarts" by Example,"MY KZ, YR BF" by Everything Everything and "Hollywood" by Marina and the Diamonds.

Fenech-Soler co-wrote and featured on the Groove Armada track "Paper Romance", taken from their album Black Light (2010). Fenech-Soler have appeared on Channel 4's EVO Rooms, NME Takeover and BBC Switch.

Awards and nominations
2010: Q Award nomination
2011: Nomination for the 10th Annual Independent Music Awards under the "Dance/Electronica" category for "Lies".

Discography

Studio albums

Extended plays

Singles

As lead artist

As featuring artist

Promotional singles

Notes

References

External links

 
 
 
 

British electronic music groups
Maltese musical groups
Remixers
Musical groups established in 2006